The Dream Cheater is a 1920 American silent horror film directed by Ernest C. Warde and starring J. Warren Kerrigan, Wedgwood Nowell and Fritzi Brunette. It is based on the 1831 novel La Peau de chagrin by Honoré de Balzac.

Cast
 J. Warren Kerrigan as Brandon McShane
 Wedgwood Nowell as Angus Burton 
 Alice Wilson as Mimi Gascoigne
 Joseph J. Dowling as Shib Mizah
 Tom Guise as Patrick Fitz-George
 Fritzi Brunette as Pauline Mahon
 Aggie Herring as Mrs. Mahon
 Sam Sothern as Shamus McShane

References

Bibliography
 Soister, John T., Nicolella, Henry & Joyce, Steve. American Silent Horror, Science Fiction and Fantasy Feature Films, 1913-1929. McFarland, 2014.

External links
 

1920 films
1920 horror films
1920s English-language films
American silent feature films
American horror films
American black-and-white films
Films directed by Ernest C. Warde
Films distributed by W. W. Hodkinson Corporation
Films based on works by Honoré de Balzac
1920s American films
Silent horror films
English-language horror films